Two destroyers of the Imperial Japanese Navy have been named Shigure:
 , a  launched in 1906 and scrapped in 1924
 , a  launched in 1935 and sunk in 1945

Imperial Japanese Navy ship names
Japanese Navy ship names